Kevin McAleer (born 1956) is an Irish stand-up comedian. He came to prominence on the RTÉ television show Nighthawks which began broadcasting in the late 1980s. McAleer became known for his three-minute sketches of surreal rustic tales told in his slow County Tyrone drawl. One critic said that McAleer "put the dead back into deadpan". In 2022 he toured his one man show entitled Why am I Here and played the part of boring Uncle Colm in Derry Girls on Channel 4. His latest show for 2023 is 'Kev's Top 40', an attempt to condense forty years of live performances into ninety minutes on stage.

Personal life and writing
McAleer lives in Omagh, County Tyrone; he believes his comic talents blossomed in the classroom and he lived in Barcelona, Spain, for a period.

In July 2009, McAleer stated that he has completed a first draft of a book about John F. Kennedy. The book remains unfinished. He writes in his office which is located in Omagh and cites Flann O'Brien, James Joyce, Don DeLillo, Umberto Eco and Nikolai Gogol as influences.

McAleer writes occasional comic pieces for the Irish Times, responding to current events such as Brexit.

References

External links
 

1956 births
Living people
Irish male comedians
Male comedians from Northern Ireland
Stand-up comedians from Northern Ireland
Television personalities from Northern Ireland
People from County Tyrone
Sunday Independent (Ireland) people
Place of birth missing (living people)
20th-century comedians from Northern Ireland
21st-century comedians from Northern Ireland